Hotarionomus is a genus of longhorn beetles of the subfamily Lamiinae, containing the following species:

 Hotarionomus abbreviatus Breuning, 1948
 Hotarionomus blattoides (Pascoe, 1856)
 Hotarionomus ilocanus Heller, 1899

References

Lamiini